Constitutional Assembly elections were held in Western Samoa on 23 July 1960.

Background
In preparation for independence on 1 January 1962, a Constitutional Assembly was called to write a constitution for the soon-to-be independent country. The Assembly was to include the 46 members of the Legislative Assembly elected in 1957 (41 Samoans and 5 Europeans), the Fautua (the two paramount chiefs of Samoa, Malietoa Tanumafili II and Tupua Tamasese Meaʻole), Tama-a-Aiga Tuiaana Tuimaleali'ifano Suatipatipa II, 123 elected chiefs (three elected from each of the 41 Samoan Legislative Assembly constituencies) and 10 elected Europeans.

In order to vote in the elections, European residents were required to take Samoan citizenship. However, only 500 of the 1,500 eligible Europeans did so, with some arguing that they should not have to renounce their nationality at a time when the Samoan state did not exist.

Campaign
In the 41 Samoan constituencies, only twelve had more than three candidates and required a vote to take place. All candidates were matais. Only five Europeans were nominated for the ten seats, all of whom were returned unopposed.

List of members

References

Western Samoa
Elections in Samoa
1960 in Western Samoa Trust Territory
July 1960 events in Oceania